The 1975–76 Bradford City A.F.C. season was the 63rd in the club's history.

The club finished 17th in Division Four, reached the 6th round of the FA Cup, and the 1st round of the League Cup.

Sources

References

Bradford City A.F.C. seasons
Bradford City